= Clinical Tropical Dermatology =

1975 medical book edited by Orlando Canizares

- Editor: Orlando Canizares
- Publisher: Blackwell Scientific Publications
- Publication date: 1975
- ISBN: 9780865421950
- OCLC: 24107577

Clinical Tropical Dermatology is a medical book edited by Orlando Canizares, and published in 1975 by Blackwell Scientific Publications. A second edition was published in 1992, around the time of Canizares's death.
